Lee Andrew Slattery (born 3 August 1978) is an English professional golfer who plays on the European Tour. He has won twice on the tour, the 2011 Bankia Madrid Masters and the 2015 M2M Russian Open.

Professional career
Slattery turned professional in 1998 and spent his early career playing in minor tournaments on mini-tours in the United Kingdom. He won the Tour Championship on the PGA EuroPro Tour in 2001. At the end of 2000 he moved to South Africa to play on the Sunshine Tour during the northern hemisphere winter. He was stuck down by glandular fever in 2002, which forced him to take an extended break from the game.

Having returned to golf in late 2003, Slattery resumed his career in South Africa before returning to the PGA EuroPro Tour at the start of 2004. He won twice early in the season, before getting the chance to play in the North West Challenge on the second tier Challenge Tour. He finished as runner up there and as a result further opportunities on the tour were forthcoming, which he made full use of. He finished tied for 3rd the next tournament, and went on record three other podium finishes including a win in Sweden at the Telia Grand Prix. He ended the season on top of the Challenge Tour Rankings to graduate to the elite European Tour for 2005.
 
Until 2011, Slattery had yet to establish himself on the European Tour, finishing inside the top 100 on the Order of Merit just once, in 2006. He missed out on retaining his card in 2007 by just €77, but immediately regained it via the end of season qualifying school. He lost his card in 2009, but regained it by finishing in the top 20 of the 2010 Challenge Tour rankings.

On 9 October 2011, he won the Bankia Madrid Masters tournament with a 15 under par total with top players including world number one Luke Donald in the field. It was his maiden European Tour title. After taking a two stroke advantage into the final round, it soon disappeared after a shaky start on the front nine with two bogeys early on. He recovered on the back nine though with a run of four birdies in five holes and despite a double bogey at the last, Slattery prevailed by a single stroke from Lorenzo Gagli. He secured his tour card for the 2012 season with this win.

In 2014 he finished 111th in the Race to Dubai, one place and €7,318 short of retaining his European Tour card, leaving him with limited status for the 2015 season. He regained full status by winning the Russian Open in September, his second European Tour title.

Professional wins (7)

European Tour wins (2)

Challenge Tour wins (2)

PGA EuroPro Tour wins (2)

EuroPro Tour wins (1)
2001 EuroPro Tour Championship

Results in major championships

CUT = missed the half-way cut
"T" = tied

Results in World Golf Championships

"T" = Tied

Team appearances
Professional
European Championships (representing Great Britain): 2018

See also
2007 European Tour Qualifying School graduates
2010 Challenge Tour graduates

References

External links

English male golfers
European Tour golfers
Sunshine Tour golfers
1978 births
Living people
Sportspeople from Southport